Untitled is the ninth studio album by American R&B recording artist R. Kelly. It was released by Jive Records on December 1, 2009. It was entirely produced by R. Kelly and a team of younger producers.

The album debuted at number 4 on the US Billboard 200, and also reached the top of the Top R&B/Hip-Hop Albums chart. Untitled received generally mixed reviews from contemporary music critics. The album has sold over 500,000 copies.

Background 
In 2008, the album's title was initially supposed to be released under the name 12 Play: 4th Quarter, however, that version of this project leaked before release and so it was decided that the whole project should be re-recorded. That title is still referenced in several songs on the album.

Singles 
Supaman High featuring OJ da Juiceman was supposed to be the album's lead single, but due to a label and artist dispute, it was repurposed as a promotional single for the album

The album's lead single, "Number One" featuring Keri Hilson, was released on July 28, 2009. The song peaked at number 59 on the US Billboard Hot 100 and number 7 on the Hot R&B/Hip-Hop Songs charts.

Both second and third singles, "Religious" and "Echo" (both released October 10, 2009), charted lower, with peak positions of numbers 48 and 52 respectively on the Hot R&B/Hip-Hop Songs.

Critical reception 

Untitled received generally positive reviews from music critics. At Metacritic, which assigns a normalized rating out of 100 to reviews from mainstream critics, the album received an average score of 62, based on 15 reviews, which indicates "generally favorable reviews". Allmusic writer Andy Kellman gave it three-and-a-half out of five stars and called it "a simple, concept-free, creatively unambitious R&B album". Mikael Wood of Spin complimented the album's "fresh raunch", noting "'Bangin' the Headboard' and 'Pregnant' (as in 'You make me wanna get you…') are bawdy even by Kelly's considerable standards". Tom Horan of The Daily Telegraph praised Kelly's "unwavering focus" and stated, "should headboard-banging be in the offing, this will make a fine accompaniment."

In a mixed review, The A.V. Clubs Nathan Rabin gave the album a C+ rating and commented that it "feels generic". Drew Hinshaw  of The Village Voice found it lacking any "larger themes from Untitleds sex seminars" and stated, "It's tragic to see a master of r&b finesse fall back onto a childish, domineering bent that comes off as boorish, entitled, and mean-spirited." Chicago Tribune writer Greg Kot wrote that Kelly "massages simple (and sometimes simplistic) words into hooks through phrasing that is pliant, inventive, audacious, sometimes silly", commenting that "That ardor is framed by music that is everything his lyrics are not: subtle, ornate, at times downright refined. As a producer and arranger, he is meticulous with detail, orchestrating hand claps, finger snaps and drum machines to create just the right rhythm backdrop for an evening of 'wooo and weee'". Jon Pareles of The New York Times found the album "routine" for Kelly, although he stated, "Still, even a routine R. Kelly song outshines much of the competition."

Accolades 
In 2011, Untitled was nominated for a Grammy Award for Best Contemporary R&B Album, presented at the 53rd Grammy Awards.

Commercial performance 
The album debuted at number 4 on the US Billboard 200, selling 110,000 copies in its first week, marking his ninth top five album on the chart. As of June 2022, the album sold over 500,000 copies in the United States. A disappointing performance compared to his previous album Double Up which debuted at number 1 on the US Billboard 200 and sold over 1,000,000 copies

Track listing

Charts

Weekly charts

Year-end charts

Release history

See also
List of number-one R&B albums of 2009 (U.S.)

References

External links
 

2009 albums
R. Kelly albums
Albums produced by Jack Splash
Albums produced by Jazze Pha
Albums produced by R. Kelly
Jive Records albums